Syrianarpia is a genus of moths of the family Crambidae.

Species
Syrianarpia faunieralis Gianti, 2005
Syrianarpia kasyi Leraut, 1984
Syrianarpia mendicalis (Staudinger, 1879)

References

Natural History Museum Lepidoptera genus database

Scopariinae
Crambidae genera